XHZX-FM is a radio station on 89.3 FM in Tenosique, Tabasco, known as ZX Radio.

History
XEZX-AM received its concession on September 30, 1964. It was owned by María de Lourdes Torres Garza and operated with 1,000 watts on 1240 kHz. By the end of the 1960s, XEZX had moved to 860 kHz.

From February 6, 2009, to 2011, XEZX was off the air due to a strike by unionized workers.

XEZX was cleared to migrate to FM in 2010 as XHZX-FM 89.3. When XEZX returned to the air after the strike, from new facilities, XHZX signed on for the first time.

References

External links
XHZX Radio ZX Facebook

Radio stations in Tabasco